The Philomathean Society at New York University was a student society that was founded at New York University. (The society shared its name with other college societies including the Philomathean Society of the University of Pennsylvania.) This society existed from 1832 to 1888.

In 1832 students began the Philomathean Society at New York University. The society had as a rival, the Eucleian Society. (Constitution of Philomathean Society) While both societies forbade membership in their rival society, early records show that early members were sometimes expelled or resigned to join the rival society.

Student societies such as the Philomathean Society collected their own libraries and augmented the curriculum. Literary and debate societies offered a departure from the learn-by-rote instruction that prevailed in much of university instruction. The Philomathean Society provided its membership at NYU with a library and augmented student instruction. The university gave the society its own rooms at the Main University Building.

One early lecturer became a very popular figure with the society. Edgar Allan Poe was a repeated guest of the Philomathean Society and the Eucleian Society, and lived on the Square.

The society died in 1888.

References

External links 

Records of Philomathean Society at New York University Archives

New York University
1832 establishments in New York (state)
Collegiate secret societies
Student societies in the United States
Student organizations established in 1832
1888 disestablishments in New York (state)